Lars Thomas Sivertsson (born 21 February 1965) is a Swedish handball player who competed in the 1996 Summer Olympics and in the 2000 Summer Olympics.

He was born in Halmstad.

In 1996 he was a member of the Swedish handball team which won the silver medal in the Olympic tournament. He played all six matches and scored twelve goals.

Four years later he was part of the Swedish team which won the silver medal again. He played all seven matches and scored eleven goals.

He later became the coach for Wisła Płock and the Swedish women's national team.

References
 https://www.linkedin.com/in/thomas-sivertsson-39553267
 https://sok.se/idrottare/idrottare/t/thomas-sivertsson.html

1965 births
Living people
Swedish male handball players
Olympic handball players of Sweden
Handball players at the 1996 Summer Olympics
Handball players at the 2000 Summer Olympics
Olympic silver medalists for Sweden
Olympic medalists in handball
Sportspeople from Halmstad
Swedish handball coaches
Medalists at the 2000 Summer Olympics
Medalists at the 1996 Summer Olympics
20th-century Swedish people